Kristina Karjalainen (born 15 August 1989) is an Estonian-Finnish beauty queen who won Eesti Miss Estonia 2013.

Early life
Karjalainen is a freelance-translator and model. She moved from Estonia to Finland with her parents at the age of 3 and currently resides in Helsinki. Her mother, also born in Estonia, is Lithuanian and her father, born in Russia, is Finnish. Kristina speaks 5 languages and has mentioned that learning new languages is one of her hobbies. Karjalainen's other hobbies include playing basketball, dancing and swimming.

Miss Globe International 2012
Karjalainen competed at the Miss Globe International 2012 pageant as Miss Globe Finland. She placed in the Top 5 as the 4th runner-up and won the "Miss Golden Girl" award.

Eesti Miss Estonia 2013
Kristina Karjalainen was crowned Eesti Miss Estonia 2013 at the Toompea Castle in Tallinn, on June 12. She represented Estonia in Miss Universe 2013. Kristina was crowned by Eesti Miss Estonia 2011 (Miss Universe Estonia 2011), Madli Vilsar.

Other

Kristina Karjalainen is single. In 2013 Karjalainen was invited to participate in the Finnish version of the Eyeworks format Reality Queens of the Jungle (Viidakon tähtöset in Finnish), but she had to decline due to medical reasons. In 2015, she competes in a lifeguard themed reality TV show led by Martina Aitolehti.

References

External links
Official Eesti Miss Estonia website

1989 births
Living people
Miss Universe 2013 contestants
People from Tallinn
Estonian emigrants to Finland
Estonian people of Lithuanian descent
Estonian people of Finnish descent
Finnish people of Lithuanian descent
Finnish people of Estonian descent
Estonian beauty pageant winners
Estonian female models